Róbert Zimonyi (18 April 1918 – 2 February 2004) was a Hungarian-born American rowing coxswain. He competed for Hungary in various events at the 1948 and 1952 Olympics and won a bronze medal in coxed pairs. After the Hungarian Revolution of 1956, he moved to the United States and became an American citizen in 1962. With American teams, he won an Olympic gold medal in 1964 and a European bronze medal in 1965, both in the eights, and a gold medal at the 1967 Pan American Games in coxed fours.

Zimonyi left rowing in late 1960s, and did not coach. He was an accountant by training, but after immigrating to the United States, he worked at a brick company of a fellow rower John B. Kelly Sr. In 1963, he became an accountant at Sandmeyer Steel, and worked there until retiring by age in 1983.

Personal life

Zimonyi had a sister in Hungary. After that he moved to Florida to improve his health, together with his partner, Isabel Gressner.

References

Cited sources

External links

1918 births
2004 deaths
Hungarian male rowers
American male rowers
Coxswains (rowing)
Olympic rowers of Hungary
Rowers at the 1948 Summer Olympics
Rowers at the 1952 Summer Olympics
Rowers at the 1964 Summer Olympics
Olympic bronze medalists for Hungary
Olympic gold medalists for the United States in rowing
Medalists at the 1948 Summer Olympics
Medalists at the 1964 Summer Olympics
Pan American Games gold medalists for the United States
Pan American Games medalists in rowing
Rowers at the 1967 Pan American Games
European Rowing Championships medalists
Medalists at the 1967 Pan American Games
Hungarian emigrants to the United States